Discovery Peak may refer to:

 Discovery Peak (California) in California, USA. The peak name is not official.
 Discovery Peak (Washington) in Washington, USA